Eugen Ehrlich (14 September 1862 – 2 May 1922) was an Austrian legal scholar and sociologist of law. He is widely regarded as one of the primary founders of the modern field of sociology of law.

Biography
Ehrlich was born in Czernowitz (now Chernivtsi) in the Duchy of Bukovina, at that time a province of the Austro-Hungarian empire. Ehrlich studied law in Lemberg, then in Vienna, where he taught and practised as a lawyer before returning to Czernowitz to teach at the university there, a bastion of Germanic culture at the eastern edge of the Empire.

Ehrlich remained there for the rest of his teaching career and was Rector of the University in 1906–7. During the turmoil of World War I, when Czernowitz was occupied several times by Russian forces, he moved to Switzerland. After the break-up of the Austro-Hungarian Empire and the ceding of the Bukovina to Romania, Ehrlich planned to return to Czernowitz, where he would have been required to teach in Romanian, but he died of diabetes in Vienna, Austria in 1922.

Career

Ehrlich's experience of the Bukovina's legal culture, where Austrian law and sharply contrasting local custom seemed to co-exist, caused him to question the hierarchical notions of law propounded by such theorists as his fellow countryman, the jurist Hans Kelsen. Ehrlich noted that legal theories that recognized law only as a sum of statutes and court decisions gave an inadequate view of the legal reality of a community. Law, if understood sociologically, embraces much more than just state legislation and court decisions. He drew a distinction between norms for decision (Entscheidungsnormen) and social norms or norms of conduct (Lebendes Recht). The latter are created in the social interaction of people. They are rules that make everyday social association possible and stable. Such rules actually govern the life of a society and, under certain conditions, the most important of them can justifiably be regarded in popular consciousness, if not necessarily by lawyers, as law. In addition, these social norms, or "living law", as Ehrlich called them, are frequently adopted and incorporated in state law. For example, commercial usage and custom may develop and be recognized and respected by courts of law and other agencies as having normative force and legal significance.

Ehrlich claimed that the living law that regulates social life may be very different from the norms for decision applied by courts, and may sometimes attract far greater cultural authority which lawyers cannot safely ignore. Norms for decision regulate only those disputes that are brought before a judicial or other tribunal. Living law is a necessary framework for the routine structuring of social relationships. Its source is in the many different kinds of social associations in which people co-exist. Its essence is not dispute and litigation, but peace and co-operation. What counts as law (again, from a sociological perspective) depends on what kind of authority exists to give it legal significance among those it is supposed to regulate.

Ehrlich's teaching is that the sources of law's authority are plural. Some sources are political and others are cultural. As such, political and cultural sources may conflict. But not all social norms should be thought of as 'law', in Ehrlich's view. Legal norms (again, understood sociologically, rather than juristically) are typically distinguished from merely moral or customary ones by powerful feelings of revulsion which typically attach to breach of them. They are, thus, regarded as socially fundamental. In addition, legal norms are recognisable as such because they concern certain kinds of relationships, transactions and circumstances which he described as 'facts of the law' (Tatsachen des Rechts) — specially important topics or considerations for social regulation.

See also
Hugo Sinzheimer
Otto von Gierke
Otto Kahn-Freund
Karl Marx

Notes

References

 Nezhurbida, Sergiy and Maria Diachuk (2018). Eugen Ehrlich : Bibliographic Index (Series in Law). With Introductory article of Manfred Rehbider, edited by Slavka Tomascikova. Vernon Press, 352 p.  
 Ерліх, Євген. Монтеск’є та соціологічна юриспруденція / Пер. з анг. і передмова С.І. Нежурбіди // Науковий вісник Чернівецького університету: Збірник наук. праць. Вип. 728: Правознавство. - Чернівці: ЧНУ, 2014. – C. 5-14.
 Sergij Neshurbida, Manfred Rehbinder (2021). Eugen Ehrlich an der Franz‐Josephs‐Universität in Czernowitz. Beiträge zur Rechtsgeschichte Österreichs 11(1).
.

1862 births
1922 deaths
People from the Duchy of Bukovina
Bukovina Jews
Sociology of law
Rectors of Franz Joseph University (Czernowitz)
Austrian jurists
Austrian sociologists